Sara Louise Blizzard (born 17 August 1970 in Coventry, Warwickshire) is a weather presenter for East Midlands Today. She regularly presents the weather forecasts for Midlands Today and BBC North West Tonight.

She grew up in Coventry and trained in Dance and Drama when at the independent Pattison College school in east Coventry. Her broadcasting experience began when she presented a Sunday afternoon programme on the hospital radio station at Walsgrave General Hospital in Coventry. In 1993, she worked at the studios of Mercia FM, presenting the night-time Nightbeat programme which was broadcast on Leicester Sound. In March 1994, she moved to the breakfast show of Leicester Sound and had a Sunday afternoon show, and would later in the year present for three years with Guy Morris and Guy Harris.  In late 1997, she worked in Liverpool as a news reporter for L!VE TV and presented programmes such as Vets and Pets, Live Drive and Merseybeat the Crimestoppers programme with Merseyside Police Force.

She joined East Midlands Today as the weather presenter in March 1999. Her voice is used for the Trafficmaster in-car information system.

References

External links
 
 East Midlands Today profile
 A typical day for Sara
 TV Newsroom
 The weather
 [https://www.bbc.co.uk/england/realmedia/eastmidlandstoday/bb/weather_16x9_bb.ram Sara's latest eloquent weather forecast
 Personal profile 

1970 births
Living people
BBC weather forecasters
People from Coventry
People educated at Pattison College
BBC North West newsreaders and journalists